Eternal Conflict (French: Éternel conflit) is a 1948 French drama film directed by Georges Lampin and starring Annabella, Fernand Ledoux and Michel Auclair.

The film's sets were designed by the art director Léon Barsacq.

Synopsis
A disillusioned teacher gives up his job and joins a circus, where he befriends a beautiful acrobat with a complex love life.

Cast
 Fernand Ledoux as Le professeur Janvier 
 Annabella as Florence dite Lili 
 Michel Auclair as Mario 
 Louis Salou as Chardeuil 
 Line Noro as Germaine - femme de Janvier 
 Mary Morgan as Mme Chardeuil 
 Jeannette Batti as Janette 
 Jeanne Lion as Mémé 
 Colette Ripert as Mlle Chardeuil 
 Monique Arthur as La bonne 
 Gaston Modot as Le bonimenteur 
 Roland Armontel as Robert Ariani 
 Marcel André as Le proviseur 
 Guy Favières as L'inspecteur 
 Marcel Melrac as Un garçon de piste 
 Paul Delon as Le directeur 
 Philippe Lemaire as Chardeuil fils 
 Julien Maffre as Un garçon de piste 
 Albert Malbert as Le patron du café

References

Bibliography 
 Jonathan Driskell. The French Screen Goddess: Film Stardom and the Modern Woman in 1930s France. I.B.Tauris, 2015.

External links 
 

1948 films
1948 drama films
French drama films
1940s French-language films
Films directed by Georges Lampin
French black-and-white films
1940s French films